Grażyna Małgorzata Vetulani née Świerczyńska (born 15 March 1956) is a Polish  philologist and linguist, professor of the humanities, professor at the Adam Mickiewicz University in Poznań and the Nicolaus Copernicus University in Toruń.

Biography 
She is a daughter of Hieronim Świerczyński and Regina Kocińska. In 1979 she graduated in Romance studies from Adam Mickiewicz University. She received a PhD in 1988. On 17 June 2013 she received the title of full professor.

Since 1979 Grażyna Vetulani works at the Adam Mickieiwcz University in Poznań. She is a Head of Department of Contrastive Linguistics since 2000. Since 2008 she is a member of the University Senate.

Vetulani is an author of a number of scientific publications (including three books) on general, contrastive and computer linguistics and semantics. She was an editor of four joint studies. She participated as a speaker in scientific conferences several times, including events in Prague, Ljubljana, Athens, Paris and Berlin.

She is a member of editorial board of magazines Echo des études romanes. Revue semestrielle de linguistique et de littérature romanes and Etudes romanes de Brno.

In 2012 she received a Gold Medal for Long Service.

Her husband Zygmunt Vetulani is a professor of technical sciences and lecturer at Adam Mickiewicz University. They have two daughters: Agnieszka (born 1981) and Maria (born 1996).

Selected works 

 Vetulani, G., Vetulani, Z., & Obrębski, T. (2006, May). Syntactic lexicon of polish predicative nouns. In Proceedings of the Fifth International Conference on Language Resources and Evaluation (LREC’06).
 Vetulani, G. (2012). Kolokacje werbo-nominalne jako samodzielne jednostki języka. Wydawnictwo Naukowe Uniwersytetu im. Adama Mickiewicza.
 Vetulani, G. (2013). Problemy i korzyści wynikające z automatycznego przetwarzania korpusów-na przykładzie badań z zakresu predykacji rzeczownikowej w języku polskim. Roczniki Humanistyczne, 61(08), 13-24.
 Vetulani, Z., Vetulani, G., & Kochanowski, B. (2016, May). Recent advances in development of a lexicon-grammar of Polish: PolNet 3.0. In Tenth International Conference on Language Resources and Evaluation (LREC 2016) (pp. 2851-2854).
 Vetulani, G. (2018). Próby formalizacji zdań opartych na predykatach rzeczownikowych języka polskiego.

References 

Living people
Linguists from Poland
Women linguists
Polish philologists
Women philologists
1956 births
Adam Mickiewicz University in Poznań alumni
Academic staff of Adam Mickiewicz University in Poznań
People from Bydgoszcz